Holbrook Creek is a creek in east central Yukon, Canada.

The landscape surrounding Holbrook Creek lies in the Fort Selkirk Volcanic Field of the Northern Cordilleran Volcanic Province. During the Pleistocene period, a basaltic lava flow from the Fort Selkirk field engulfed the mouth of the Holbrook Creek. Remnants of this lava flow are exposed along the Yukon River for about one kilometre.

See also
List of rivers of Yukon
List of volcanoes in Canada
List of Northern Cordilleran volcanoes
Volcanism of Canada
Volcanism of Northern Canada

References

Rivers of Yukon
Volcanism of Yukon
Pleistocene volcanism